Ichthyophis asplenius is a species of amphibian in the family Ichthyophiidae found in Malaysia and possibly Thailand. It is also known as broad-striped caecilian, Boven Mahakkam caecilian and Malayan caecilian. It is only known with certainty from Mahakam River and Matang Hunting Reserve
Its natural habitats are subtropical or tropical moist lowland forests, rivers, intermittent rivers, plantations, rural gardens, heavily degraded former forest, irrigated land, and seasonally flooded agricultural land.

References

asplenius
Amphibians described in 1965
Amphibians of Malaysia
Taxonomy articles created by Polbot
Amphibians of Borneo